Holidoteidae is a family of marine isopods belonging to the suborder Valvifera.

Genera
There are four genera:
 Austroarcturus Kensley, 1975
 Holidotea Barnard, 1920
 Neoarcturus Barnard, 1914
 Pleuroprion zur Strassen, 1903

References

Valvifera
Crustacean families